The Waiting is a studio album by singer-songwriter Royal Wood, released in 2010, published by Songs of MapleMusic Publishing.

Track listing
You Can't Go Back
Do You Recall
Waiting
On Top Of Your Love
Birds On Sunday
The Island
A Discovery (We're Lovely)
Tonight I Will Be Your Guide
Paradise
Lady In White
When Nothing's Left

Additional information
All songs were written by Royal Wood.

 Tracks 1, 2, and 6 were produced, recorded and mixed by Pierre Marchand
 Tracks 3, 4, 5, 7-11 were produced by Dean Drouillard and Royal Wood
 Tracks 3, 4, 5, 9, and 10 were mixed by Pascal Shefteshy
 Tracks 7, 8, and 11 were mixed by Dean Drouillard

Recorded and engineered by Pascal Sheftshy at Studio PM. Additional recording by Jeff Elliot at BoomBox Sound Studios, Jeremy Darby at Canterbury Sound and Dean Drouillard at Dragon's Den Studio.

 Mastered by Fedge
 Strings arranged by Royal Wood
 Horns on "Birds on Sunday" were arranged by Royal Wood
 Horns on "Tonight I Will Be Your Guide" were arranged by Bryden Baird
 "A Discovery" and "Paradise" arranged by Royal Wood, Dean Drouillard, and Adam Warner
 Royal Wood - vocals, piano, tack piano, acoustic guitar, nylon string guitar, keyboards, rhodes, wurlitzer, synths, marxophone, handclaps
 Dean Drouillard - electric guitar, acoustic guitar, nylon string guitar, marxophone, synths, handclaps
 Adam Warner - drums, percussion, handclaps
 Steve Zsirai - upright bass, electric bass, handclaps
 Karen Graves - 1st violin
 Kathryn Sugden - 2nd violin
 Johann Lotter - viola
 Kevin Fox - cello
 Catherine Le Saunier - cello on "You Can't Go Back"
 David French - tenor saxophone, bass clarinet, flute
 Bryden Baird - trumpet, French horn, flugel horn
 William Carn - trombone

Group vocals on "Lady in White" were performed by Sue Passmore, Courtney Farquhar, Miranda Mulholland, Peter Katz, Dean Drouillard, Ron Leary, Andrew Masse, and Steve Zsirai.

2010 albums
Royal Wood albums